This List of leading goalscorers for the Tunisia national football team contains football players who have played for the Tunisia national team and is listed according to their number of goals scored. The Tunisia national football team (Arabic: المنتخب التونسي) represents the nation of Tunisia  in international football. It is fielded by the Tunisian Football Federation (Arabic: الجامعة التونسية لكرة القدم) and competes as a member of Confederation of African Football.

 Players Goals and appearances are composed of FIFA World Cup and Africa Cup of Nations matches, as well as numerous international friendly tournaments and matches. Players marked in yellow are still active and eligible (meaning they have not retired) to play for the national team.''

World Cup scorers

African Cup of Nations scorers

See also 
 List of Tunisia international footballers

References 

Tunisia national football team